The 1918 Wilton by-election was a parliamentary by-election held for the British House of Commons constituency of Wilton in Wiltshire on 6 November 1918.  The seat had become vacant when  the Conservative Member of Parliament Sir Charles Bathurst had been elevated to the peerage as Viscount Bledisloe. He had held the seat since the January 1910 general election.

The Conservative candidate, Hugh Morrison, was returned unopposed.

This was the last by-election before the general election held in December 1918, when the Wilton constituency was abolished.

See also 
 Wilton (UK Parliament constituency)
 1900 Wilton by-election
 The town of Wilton
 List of United Kingdom by-elections

References 
 

1918 in England
1918 elections in the United Kingdom
By-elections to the Parliament of the United Kingdom in Wiltshire constituencies
Unopposed by-elections to the Parliament of the United Kingdom (need citation)
20th century in Wiltshire
November 1918 events